Baker High School is an accredited public high school in Baker, Louisiana. It is a part of the City of Baker School System.

About the school
Baker High School was founded in the early 1900s and resides in Baker, a town in north East Baton Rouge Parish. BHS provides an assortment of regular and honors level courses, and College Dual Enrollment opportunities with BRCC.

All 10th through 12th grade students are required to wear uniforms which includes a red polo style shirt with khakis. There is a ninth grade academy in which students are required to wear white uniform shirts.

The school auditorium, a fan-shaped Modernist structure built in 1959, was added to the National Register of Historic Places on January 29, 2014.

Athletics
Baker competes in the LHSAA 3A athletic class and all home sporting events are held on campus (field and gym sports). Current Athletic Director is Eric Randall

The athletic programs include:
Football
Boys Basketball
Girls Basketball
Volleyball
Boys and Girls Track & Field
Baseball
Softball
Golf
Cheerleading
Dance

Championships
Football championships
(2) State Championships: 1947, 1950

Notable alumni
 
Billy Brown, track and field athlete; competed in the triple jump at the 1936 Summer Olympics
Terry Felton, former Major League Baseball (MLB) player (Minnesota Twins)
Hokie Gajan, former Louisiana State University and National Football League (NFL) running back (New Orleans Saints)
Don Lemon, journalist and television news anchor, best known as the host of CNN's prime-time weekday show CNN Tonight with Don Lemon
Jerald Sowell, former Tulane and NFL full back (New York Jets)
Linda Thomas-Greenfield, American diplomat who is the United States ambassador to the United Nations 
Lunda Wells, Dallas Cowboys tight ends coach

See also
National Register of Historic Places listings in East Baton Rouge Parish, Louisiana

References

External links
 Baker High School

Public high schools in Louisiana
Schools in East Baton Rouge Parish, Louisiana